Santiago, also known as The Gun Runner, is a 1956 film directed by Gordon Douglas and starring and co-produced by Alan Ladd set in 1898 Cuba against the background of the Cuban War of Independence. Martin Rackin wrote the screenplay, based on his unpublished novel, as well as producing the film.

Plot
A hardened gun runner attempts to take a shipment to Cuba to assist with the rebellion against Spain.

Cast
 Alan Ladd as Caleb "Cash" Adams
 Rossana Podestà as Doña Isabella (By courtesy of Lux Film)
 Lloyd Nolan as Clay Pike
 Chill Wills as Captain "Sidewheel" Jones
 Paul Fix as Trasker
 L. Q. Jones as "Digger"
 Frank De Kova as Jingo
 George J. Lewis as Pablo
 Royal Dano as "Lobo"
 Don Blackman as Sam
 Francisco Ruiz as Juanito
 Clegg Hoyt as "Dutch"
 Nesdon Booth as Burns

Production
The project was first announced in July 1955 and was originally known as The Greater Courage. It was based on an unpublished novel by Martin Rackin, who also acted as producer. Although Ladd had his own production company, Jaguar Productions, who released movies through Warner Bros, he made this movie for Warners solely as actor.

"The principal difficulty, whether you take a salary from a studio or are in business for yourself, is finding the right story", said Ladd. "Once the story is set, the operation follows a pattern, so you may as well own a piece of the negative – even if you have to beg, borrow or steal to get your hands on it."

Martin Rackin hired John Twist to work on the script.

Female lead Rossana Podestà had just made Helen of Troy.

The jungle set cost $125,000.

According to Turner Classic Movies:
The celebrated Cuban poet, philosopher, and revolutionary patriot José Martí (Ernest Sarracino) also makes an appearance, although the real Martí had been dead and buried for three years by 1898, when this yarn takes place. We never see Antonio Maceo Grajales, the high-ranking liberation fighter supposedly waiting for the munitions in the Cuban village of Santiago, but again, the actual Maceo died in battle near the end of 1896. The historical blunders in Santiago were easily spotted and pointedly criticized by Cuban observers, and according to the entertainment trade paper Variety, a union of Cuban educators sent correct information to Warner Bros. via the American embassy, hoping to forestall such errors in the future. One hopes the studio took note, but anyone who knows Hollywood knows this was a very long shot.

Release
The film's Latin America premiere was held in Santiago. A holiday was declared to mark the occasion.

See also
List of American films of 1956

References

External links

Review of film at The New York Times
Santiago at TCMDB

1950s historical adventure films
1956 films
American historical adventure films
Films set in Cuba
Films shot in California
Spanish–American War films
Warner Bros. films
Films adapted into comics
Films directed by Gordon Douglas
Films scored by David Buttolph
1950s English-language films
1950s American films